The southern part of the Iberian peninsula was under Islamic rule for seven hundred years.  In medieval history, "al-Andalus" was the name given to the parts of the  Iberian Peninsula and Septimania governed by Arab and North African Muslims (given the generic name of Moors), at various times in the period between 711 and 1492.

Dependent rulers of al-Andalus

Most of the Visigothic Kingdom of Hispania was conquered by the Umayyads in 711-18. Hispania (or al-Andalus) was organized as a single province (wilayah), with local provincial capital at Córdoba, and integrated into their empire.  In the administrative structure of the Umayyad Caliphate,  al-Andalus was formally a province subordinate to the Umayyad governor of Kairouan in Ifriqiya, rather than directly dependent on the Umayyad Caliph in Damascus.  Most of the governors (wali) of al-Andalus from 711 to 756 were provincial deputies appointed by the governor in Kairouan, although a significant number of Andalusian governors during this period were chosen locally, with or without Kairouan's consent.  Only one governor was a direct Caliphal appointee for Spain.

Although often characterized as "Umayyad governors", none of these dependent governors were actually members of the Umayyad family. They should not be confused with the later independent Umayyad emirs and caliphs of al-Andalus after 756 (who were indeed Umayyad family members).

Key: All appointed by governor of Ifriqiya except (*) elected internally by Andalusians; (**) appointed directly by Caliph; (***) forcibly imposed by Syrian regiments 

Musa ibn Nusair al-Lakhmi, 712 – September 714 (also governor of Ifriqiya)
Abd al-Aziz ibn Musa, September 714 – March 716
Ayyub ibn Habib al-Lakhmi, March 716 – August 716 (*)
al-Hurr ibn Abd al-Rahman al-Thaqafi, August 716 – March 719
al-Samh ibn Malik al-Khawlani, March 719 – June 721 (**)
Abd al-Rahman ibn Abd Allah al-Ghafiqi, July 721 (*)
Anbasa ibn Suhaym al-Kalbi, August 721 – January 726
Udhra ibn Abd Allah al-Fihri, January 726 – March 726 (*)
Yahya ibn Salama al-Kalbi, March 726 – June 728
Hudhaifa ibn al-Ahwas al-Ashja'i, June 728 – December 728
Uthman ibn Abi Nis'a al-Khath'ami, December 728 – April 729
al-Haytham ibn Ubayd al-Kilabi, April 729 – February 730
Muhammad ibn Abd Allah al-Ashja'i, February 730 – March 730
Abd al-Rahman ibn Abd Allah al-Ghafiqi, March 730 – October 732 (2nd time, by appointment)
Abd al-Malik ibn Katan al-Fihri, December 732 – November 734
Uqba ibn al-Hajjaj al-Saluli, November 734 – December 740
Abd al-Malik ibn Katan al-Fihri, December 740 – March 742 (*)
Balj ibn Bishr al-Qushayri, March 742 – August 742 (**/***, technically also governor of Ifriqiya)
Thalaba ibn Salama al-Amili, August 742 – May 743 (***)
Abu'l-Khattar al-Husam ibn Darar al-Kalbi, May 743 – August 745
Thuwaba ibn Salama al-Judhami, August 745 – October 746 (***)
Abd al-Rahman ibn Qatir al-Lakhmi, October 746 – January 747 (qadi, temporary)
Yusuf ibn Abd al-Rahman al-Fihri, January 747 – May 756 (*)

Independent rulers of al-Andalus

Umayyad emirs of Córdoba
In 750, the Abbasid Revolution overthrew the Umayyad caliphate in Damascus. An Umayyad prince, Abd ar-Rahman I, escaped to al-Andalus and set up the independent Emirate of Cordoba.
Abd ar-Rahman I, 756–788
Al-Ala ibn Mughith al-Judhami (763), Abbasid counter-claimant
Abd al-Rahman ibn Habib al-Fihri al-Siqlabi (777), Abbasid counter-claimant
Hisham I, 788–796
al-Hakam I, 796–822
Abd ar-Rahman II, 822–852
Muhammad I, 852–886
al-Mundhir, 886–888
Abdallah ibn Muhammad, 888–912
Abd ar-Rahman III, 912–929

Umayyad caliphs of Córdoba
In 929, the Emir Abd ar-Rahman III, proclaimed himself the Caliph, the leader of the Islamic world, in competition with the Abbasid and the Fatimid caliphates which were also active at this time.
Abd ar-Rahman III, as caliph, 929–961
Al-Hakam II, 961–976
Hisham II, 976–1008
Muhammad II, 1008–1009
Sulayman II, 1009–1010
Hisham II, restored, 1010–1012
Sulayman II, restored, 1012–1016
Al-Mu'ayti, rival, 1014–1016
Abd ar-Rahman IV, 1017

Hammudid caliphs of Córdoba

Ali ibn Hammud al-Nasir, 1016–1018
Al-Qasim ibn Hammud al-Ma'mu, 1018–1021
Yahya ibn Ali ibn Hammud al-Mu'tali, 1021–1023
Al-Qasim ibn Hammud al-Ma'mu, 1023 (restored)

Umayyad caliphs of Córdoba (restored)

Abd-ar-Rahman V, 1023–1024
Muhammad III, 1024–1025
interreign of Yahya ibn Ali ibn Hammud al-Mu'tali, 1025–1026
Hisham III, 1026–1031

Collapse of the Caliphate of Córdoba, end of the Umayyads, beginning of the first Taifa period.

See also
Caliphate of Córdoba

References
General

Specific

Umayyad Governors of Al-Andalus
Umayyad Governors of Al-Andalus
 
Medieval Islamic world-related lists